The surname Mainwaring ( or ) is an Anglo-Norman territorial surname deriving from "Mesnil Warin" (or "Mesnilwarin", "Mesnilvarin", "Mesnil Varin"), from the village of Le Mesnil Varin (= "the manor of Warin"), now Saint-Paër, Normandy. 

Notable people with the surname include:

People

 Billy Mainwaring (1941–2019), Welsh international second row rugby union player who played for Aberavon RFC
 Chris Mainwaring (1965–2007), Australian rules footballer and TV presenter
 Daniel Mainwaring (1902–1977), American novelist and screenwriter
 George Mainwaring (1642-1695), English politician
 George Boulton Mainwaring (c. 1773-unknown), British politician
 Greg Manwaring (b. 1962), Classical animator, director, member of the Academy of Motion Pictures Arts and Sciences
 Lieutenant-Colonel Harry Mainwaring (1919–2014), who was awarded an MC in fierce fighting after D-Day in the Normandy Campaign
 Henry Mainwaring (c. 1586-1653), pirate, lawyer, author and diplomat
 John Mainwaring (1724–1807), English theologian and first biographer of the composer Georg Friedrich Händel
 Marion Mainwaring (1922–2015),  American novelist
 Matty Mainwaring (b. 1990), English footballer and boxer
 Sam Mainwaring (1841–1907), Welsh socialist and syndicalist trade union activist
 William Mainwaring (1884–1971), British miner and politician
 William Mainwaring (English politician) (1735–1821), English politician, father of George Boulton Mainwaring
 Ranulph Mainwaring, Justice of Chester in the reign of Richard I (1189–1199)
 Sam Mainwaring, Jr., labor activist in Britain, South Africa and the United States; nephew of Sam Mainwaring

In fiction
 Captain George Mainwaring, commander of the Home Guard platoon in the BBC sitcom Dad's Army
 Elizabeth Mainwaring, Captain Mainwaring's wife
 Barry Mainwaring, Captain Mainwaring's long-lost brother
 Lil Mainwaring,  In Movie "Marnie" - Alfred Hitcock's movie - Sean Connery's Main Line Philadelphia former sister in law
 Veronica Mainwaring,  Protagonist in Demon Lover, 1929 novel by Dion Fortune

Transportation
 Mainwaring (HBC vessel), operated by the HBC from 1807-1820, see Hudson's Bay Company vessels

See also
 Mainwaring baronets
 Bertred Mainwaring, wife of Henry de Aldithley/Audley and Audley-Stanley family
 Mannering, a surname
 Manwaring, a surname

References